Matheus Gonçalves Savio (born 15 April 1997) is a Brazilian footballer who plays as an attacking midfielder or a winger for J1 League club Kashiwa Reysol.

Career

Flamengo
Matheus debuted in the professional team on 25 March 2015, as a substitute, in a Rio de Janeiro State League match against Bangu. Flamengo won 2-1. Later in the same year he had his first Brazilian Série A appearance on 14 October 2015 against Figueirense. Flamengo lost 3-0 and Matheus played only seven minutes, again as substitute.
 
On 13 May 2017 Matheus scored his first Brazilian Série A goal on the season opener 1-1 draw against Atlético Mineiro at Maracanã Stadium.

Estoril Praia (loan)
On 5 January 2018 Flamengo announced the loan of Matheus Sávio to Estoril until the end of 2018.

CSA (loan)
On 27 December 2018, Sávio joined CSA on a loan deal.

Kashiwa Reysol
After a good performance playing on loan for Kashiwa Reysol Matheus signed, on 9 December 2019, his transfer from Flamengo to the Japanese club on a US$1.1 million. Flamengo received 50% of the transfer fee.

Career statistics
(Correct )

Honours
Flamengo
 Campeonato Carioca: 2017

CSA
 Campeonato Alagoano: 2019

Kashiwa Reysol
 J2 League: 2019

References

External links

1997 births
Living people
Footballers from São Paulo (state)
Brazilian footballers
Association football midfielders
Brazilian expatriate footballers
Campeonato Brasileiro Série A players
Primeira Liga players
J2 League players
J1 League players
CR Flamengo footballers
G.D. Estoril Praia players
Centro Sportivo Alagoano players
Kashiwa Reysol players
Brazil under-20 international footballers
Brazilian expatriate sportspeople in Portugal
Brazilian expatriate sportspeople in Japan
Expatriate footballers in Portugal
Expatriate footballers in Japan